Aleksandr Khant (born December 3, 1985) is a Russian film director. After graduating from VGIK in 2015, he released his debut film How Vitka Chesnok Drove Lyokha Shtyr to the House for Disabled in 2017. The film went on to win prizes at film festivals in Karlovy Vary and Vyborg.

References

Russian film directors
1985 births
Living people
Place of birth missing (living people)